The 4th Filmfare Awards were held on 5 May 1957, in Bombay, honoring the best films in Hindi cinema for the year 1956.

Devdas and Jhanak Jhanak Payal Baaje led the ceremony with 4 nominations each.

Jhanak Jhanak Payal Baaje won 4 awards, including Best Film and Best Director (for V. Shantaram), thus becoming the most-awarded film at the ceremony.

While most of the nominated films were released in 1956, the films which won most of the main awards were 1955 releases. Devdas, Jhanak Jhanak Payal Baaje, Seema and Shree 420 were 1955 films, but were not considered for the 3rd Filmfare Awards.

For the first time in the history of Filmfare Awards did a winner refuse to accept their award – Vyjayanthimala, who won Best Supporting Actress for Devdas, declined her award as she thought that her role was not supporting and was equally important as that film's other female lead, Suchitra Sen.

Main awards

Technical awards

Multiple nominations and wins

The following films received multiple awards and nominations.

See also
 11th Filmfare Awards
 9th Filmfare Awards
 Filmfare Awards

References

External links
 Winners and nominations of 4th Filmfare Awards at Internet Movie Database

Filmfare Awards
Filmfare
1957 in Indian cinema